Dos Monos is a Japanese experimental hip hop group based in Tokyo, Japan. The group consists of Zo Zhit, Taitan, and NGS, also referred to as Botsu. All three members provide vocals while Zo and Botsu produce and sample as well.
The group released their debut album Dos City on March 20, 2019, under the independent record label Deathbomb Arc. Dos Monos has gained more attention from both within and outside of their homeland of Japan.

Members 
 Zo Zhit
 In charge of Truck Maker and MC. 1993 Born August 24. He is a Dos Monos track maker based on his vast knowledge of music, film and philosophy. He started playing electric guitar when he was in junior high school, started with old rock, and preferred jazz rock, like Miles Davis. He became familiar with progressive rock and avant-garde free jazz in high school and liked Frank Zappa . He continued to write songs by himself using Ableton Live as the people around him left the band, preparing for college entrance exams. While majoring in film at university and aiming to become a film director, he listens to hip-hop such as Madlib and J Dilla and enjoys beatmaking.

 A hardcore reader, he likes to read philosophical books, thought books, and criticisms in addition to novels. In that regard, "they have clearly inspired those who provide pop culture for at least the 20th century, ... they're the source of ideas, and they're literacy to avoid boring things. And in that sense, I think they are also necessary for artists. ". 
 addition to his activities at Dos Monos, he also produces, provides music, and collaborates with other artists.

 TaiTan
 In charge of MC. Born October 12, 1993. He is familiar with theater and was an actor himself in college. And he especially like the playwright Matsuo Suzuki .

 Besides working as Dos Monos, he also works as copywriter / planner under his real name. His past projects include Kendrick Lamar planning a "black-painted advertisement" promotion in Japan .

 From May 1, 2020, the Spotify program "KiKi Kaikai MeiKai Encyclopedia" was distributed with Mono no aware Shukei Tamaki.
 He loves curry (especially South Indian one) and he is the personality of Spotify's "TOKIO CURRY CLUB".

 Botsu aka NGS
 MC ・ DJ In charge. He prefers "universal but a little crazy" jazz artists like Albert Ayler and Thelonious Monk. He was in charge of drums in the band he belonged to when he was in middle school and high school. He covered punk rock such as Ging Nang BOYZ. From 2015 to 2016, he studied abroad at University of California, Los Angeles in the U.S. because of his interest in jazz musician Sun Ra. He learns Afrofuturism. In the field, loving Hi-Hi-Whoopee, he interacted with James Mathew and deepened his insight into the lo-fi beats scene.

 He used to call himself NGS because he had a habit of being late and often had terrible bed hair(called NEGUSE in Japanese). But MARIA in SIMI LAB call him "Sleeping Poops(called NEGUSO in Japanese)" by mistake, therefore he named himself BOTSU(means "cancelled") after that.
 He also collaborates with other artists a lot.

History 
The members attended same junior and senior high school in Tokyo. Each of them formed a band, Zo Zhit was a guitarist , TaiTan and Botsu were drummers .
2015, Zo Zhit formed Dos Monos with TaiTan and Botsu to make a song that used beats he had been making as a hobby. At the time, the three had experience in bands such as rock and punk, but no rap, and TaiTan had never even heard of hip-hop.
Dos Monos means "two monkeys" in Spanish. Proposed by Botsu, who was interested in Spanish culture, the other two also liked the sound and adopted it. After that, Zo Zhit added the meaning of "monkey 2.0 (evolved monkey)".

Although they were temporarily suspended due to Botsu's study abroad, they succeeded in their first overseas concert at Henz Club in Seoul in 2017. After that, they won the audition project "We Won!? Summer Sonic !?" and defeat other 3600 participants, and appeared in rock festival Summer Sonic. In 2018, they signed with the American label Deathbomb Arc and performed at the French music festival "La Magnifique Society" and the Shanghai music festival "SH △ MP". 

Released the 1st album "Dos City" which will be the album in 2019. Also, it was talked about that they are the first in the world to remix "bmbmbm" by British rock band black midi. 2020 In March, the first tour in US including appearances at music festival SXSW was scheduled, but it was canceled due to the corona epidemic.

In May 2020, they released the official collaboration song "Civil Rap Song ft. Audrey Tang who is Taiwan's IT minister, which attracted a great deal of attention as an unusual collaboration between hip-hop and the politician.

In July, an outdoor advertisement was posted in Shibuya, Tokyo, which greatly projected the sound source production screen of Ableton Live. Other musicians are planning to freely create the unreleased song "The Rite of Spring Monkey" with this screen as the only hint. This announced the release of the new album "Dos Siki".

In September 2021, they released a new album "Larderello" in the video work "Cover（蓋）" that was aired on TV Tokyo at early dawn. The content of the work was that the image of zapping the surveillance cameras in the town in real time, and it gradually projected another world spreading underground. This video work attracted attention as a complex mockumentary which connected to blogs, videos, report material-like documents, etc. posted on the net.

References

Experimental hip hop
Japanese hip hop groups
Musical groups established in 2015
2015 establishments in Japan